Olympic order in artistic gymnastics refers to the sequence in which a gymnast performs from one exercise after another in a competition.  Male gymnasts use six apparatuses in Olympic order.  Female gymnasts use four apparatuses.

For male gymnasts, the Olympic order is as follows:

1)  Floor
2)  Pommel horse
3)  Rings
4)  Vault
5)  Parallel bars
6)  Horizontal bar

For female gymnasts, the Olympic order is as follows:

1)  Vault
2)  Uneven bars
3)  Balance beam
4)  Floor

Olympic order is performed in a circular format, i.e. in an all-around competition where there are 24 competitors, there might be four competitors on each apparatus in the first rotation. In the second rotation, each group of four gymnasts progress to the next apparatus. Male gymnast A might start on vault in the first rotation, then progress to parallel bars in the second rotation, to horizontal bar in the third rotation, then circle around to floor on the fourth rotation and end on rings in the last rotation.  Male gymnast Q might start on floor in the first rotation and then logically progress to horizontal bar in the last (sixth) rotation in an all-around competition.

References

Artistic gymnastics
Artistic gymnasts
Artistic gymnastics apparatus